Alejandro César Alonso (born 3 March 1982) is an Argentine former professional footballer who played as a midfielder. Having started his career with Club Atlético Huracán in Argentina, he went on play to for Girondins de Bordeaux, AS Monaco, and AS Saint-Étienne in France.

Career
Alonso signed a two-year deal in January 2011 with Saint-Étienne.

External links
 
 

Living people
1982 births
Footballers from Buenos Aires
Argentine footballers
Argentine sportspeople of Spanish descent
Association football midfielders
Club Atlético Huracán footballers
FC Girondins de Bordeaux players
AS Monaco FC players
AS Saint-Étienne players
Ligue 1 players
Argentine expatriate footballers
Expatriate footballers in France
Expatriate footballers in Monaco
Argentine expatriate sportspeople in France
Argentine expatriate sportspeople in Monaco
Pan American Games medalists in football
Pan American Games gold medalists for Argentina
Footballers at the 2003 Pan American Games
Medalists at the 2003 Pan American Games